Paltalk is a proprietary video group chat service that enables users to communicate by video, Internet chat, or voice. It offers chat rooms and the ability for users to create their own public virtual chat room. Paltalk Desktop is available on macOS and Windows, and Paltalk Video Chat App is available for Android and iOS. While basic services are free of charge and basic software is free to download, fee-based memberships and paid upgrades to more capable versions are offered by AVM Software, the creators of Paltalk.

Paltalk had 5.5 million unique users in 2013. An infographic created by the company in 2015 revealed that they had surpassed 100 million users.

Software 
Paltalk's main application is "Paltalk Messenger for PCs". They also offered PaltalkExpress, a free web-based Adobe Flash and Java application which could be accessed via an Internet browser. As of December 22, 2016 this program has been discontinued due to its falling support and removal from Google Chrome.

Paltalk has native apps available for Android and iOS which allow users to publish webcam, audio chat, and text chat groups or in private sessions.

Both the mobile and desktop versions of Paltalk allow users to create chat rooms where they can text, voice, and video chat. These chat rooms can host hundreds and in some cases thousands of chatters in one conversion. Paltalk users can also have private video chat sessions with up to 15 other.

Awards and recognition 

 2007: AlwaysOn 100 top Companies
 2007: NET Editor's pick
 2005: The Pulver 100

Patent protection 
Paltalk filed a series of patent lawsuits against video game developers claiming they were infringing U.S. patents 5,822,523 and 6,226,686 "Server-group messaging system for interactive applications", patents they purchased from the now-defunct company HearMe in 2002. Paltalk first brought a case against Microsoft in 2006, claiming Halo and Xbox Live violated its patent rights, and later settled out of court.

In 2009, Paltalk then moved on to Sony, Activision Blizzard, NCsoft, Jagex and Turbine, Inc., claiming that these companies are also violating Paltalk's patents whose damages range in the "tens of millions of dollars". In 2010, a US judge dismissed the lawsuit against Jagex and stated "After reviewing source code for the RuneScape video game made available by Jagex, Paltalk and Jagex agree that the RuneScape video game does not infringe the patents-in-suit."

Controversy 

In 2007, the filmed suicide of one of the service's users was widely reported in the media. Concerns were raised over the possibility that it could inspire further suicides. 

In June 2013, it was revealed that Paltalk was targeted by the National Security Agency's PRISM surveillance program. All Paltalk communications (video, phone calls, and chats) have been recorded, stored indefinitely, and evaluated by the NSA.

See also 
 Comparison of instant messaging clients
 Patent troll

References

External links 
Paltalk.com

Online chat
Android (operating system) software
BlackBerry software
Videotelephony
1998 software
Companies in the PRISM network